Alexandre Constant also known as Alfred Constant (14 September 1829, Autun – 13 May 1901, Golfe-Juan)  was a French entomologist who specialised in Lepidoptera.

Constant was a banker. He became a Member of the Société entomologique de France in 1854. He was principally interested in Microlepidoptera.

Works
Partial list
Histoire naturelle des papillons (Paris : [Desloges] (1850)
Catalogue des Lépidoptères de Saône-et-Loire (1866) 
Notes sur quelques Lépidoptères nouveaux Annales de la Société entomologique de France (6) 4  : 201-216, pl. 9 (1884), : 251-262, pl. 10 (1885)
Descriptions de Lépidoptères nouveaux ou peu connus.  Annales de la Société Entomologique de France 6 (8): 161-172 + pl. (1888) 
Descriptions de Microlépidoptères nouveaux ou peu connus Annales de la Société Entomologique de France (6) 10 : 5-16 (1890)

References

Anonym 1901: [Constant, A.] The Entomologist's Record and Journal of Variation, London 12:218	
Fowler, W. W. 1901: [Constant, A.] (The) Proceedings of the Entomological Society of London for the Year 1901 XXXV
Mac Lachlan, R. 1901: [Constant, A.] The Entomologist's Monthly Magazine, Third Series, London 37: 173-174 online

French lepidopterists
1829 births
1901 deaths
19th-century French zoologists
20th-century French zoologists
French bankers